Edmond Aloysius "Ted" Fleming (25 January 1886 – 17 May 1909) was an Australian rules footballer who played with Melbourne and University in the Victorian Football League (VFL).

Death
Fleming died on 17 May 1909, aged 23, after he had suffered a ruptured blood vessel in his stomach.

Notes

1886 births
1909 deaths
Australian rules footballers from Victoria (Australia)
University Football Club players
Melbourne Football Club players
People educated at Xavier College
University of Melbourne alumni